Sadhan Chandra Majumder (born 17 July 1950) is a Bangladeshi politician serving as the Minister of Food since 2019 and Member of Jatiya Sangsad since 2008 for Naogaon-1 constituency. He is the first ever cabinet minister from Niamatpur Upazila.

Early life
Majumder was born on 17 July 1950 in at Shibpur, Niamatpur Upazila, in Rajshahi Division. His father Kamini Kumar Majumder was the headmaster of Shibpur Government Primary School. Kamini died when Sadhan was studying at sixth grade. Besides being a teacher, he was also a farmer and sold rice for a living. His mother Sabitri Bala Majumder was a housewife. He has eight siblings in his family. He received a Bachelor of Arts degree from Naogaon Government College. After graduating, he started working as a farmer.

Political career
While studying at college, Majumder became a member of Chhatra League (the youth wing of Awami League) in 1967. In 1984, he was elected chairman of Hajinagar Union. Five years later, he was elected chairman of Niamatpur Upazila Parishad.

Majumder lost to Dr. Chhalek Choudhury of Bangladesh Nationalist Party in 1996 and 2001 general elections from Naogaon-1 constituency. In 2008, he defeated Choudhury and was elected to the 9th Jatiya Sangsad for the first time ever. In the following year, he became a member of a committee which was formed to probe corruption in Barind development works. He served as a member of the Standing Committee on Religious affairs in the 10th Jatiya Sangsad. In 2018, he was elected to the parliament for the third time. He defeated his nearest rival Mustafizur Rahman by a margin of 46,228 votes.

On 7 January 2019, Majumder took oath as Food Minister of Bangladesh. He became the first person from Niamatpur Upazila to become a cabinet minister.

Personal life
Majumder was married to Chandana Majumder since (d. 1993). They have four daughters.

References

Living people
1950 births
People from Naogaon District
Awami League politicians
9th Jatiya Sangsad members
10th Jatiya Sangsad members
11th Jatiya Sangsad members
Food ministers of Bangladesh
Bangladeshi Hindus